Acraea horta or the garden acraea is a butterfly of the family Nymphalidae. It is found in South Africa and Zimbabwe.

Description

A. horta L. (53 e, f) is one of the longest known and commonest Acraeids of the Cape, but it is also native to Pondoland, Natal, Zululand, Transvaal and Zimbabwe. It has a typical wingspan of 45–50 mm for males and 49–53 mm for females. The male is similar to that of neobule, but differs in having the black dots of the fore wing absent or only represented by a dot in the cell and another in 1b, the marginal spots of the hind wing small, elongate and incompletely separated from the ground-colour and the hindwing beneath red at the inner margin and the marginal band. In the female the forewing is almost entirely hyaline and the hindwing above light yellow to grey-yellow, beneath whitish with larger marginal spots, bounded by distinct lunules. The larva is brown-yellow with black transverse lines and yellow 7 lateral and dorsal lines, while the head and spines are black. The larva lives on Kiggelaria africana and various Passiflora species. 
 female ab. conjuncta Blachier is distinguished by having the discal dots of the hindwing changed into long, broad black stripes.

Biology
Adults are on wing year-round, but are more common from October to April.

The larvae feed on Kiggelaria africana and Passiflora (including Passiflora coerulea, Passiflora manicata and Passiflora mollisima) and Tacsonia species.

Taxonomy
It is a member of the Acraea terpsicore  species group   -   but see also Pierre & Bernaud, 2014

Gallery

References

External links

Images representing Acraea horta at Bold.

Butterflies described in 1764
horta
Butterflies of Africa
Taxa named by Carl Linnaeus